Tradescantia pinetorum, the pinewoods spiderwort, is a species of Tradescantia and part of the Commelinaceae family.

Tradescantia pinetorum is found in open woods in the southwestern United States (Arizona + New Mexico) and northwestern Mexico (Chihuahua y Sonora).

Growth 
The genus Commelina has flower buds enclosed in a sheath called a spathe, while Tradescantia does not have a spathe. Tradescantia pinetorum has glandular pubescent sepals, while Tradescantia occidentalis has glabrous sepals.

Scientifically related plants
Scientifically related plants include Tradescantia pedicellata and Aneilema pinetorum.

References

pinetorum
Plants described in 1893
Flora of the Southwestern United States
Flora of the South-Central United States
Flora of Northwestern Mexico
Flora of Northeastern Mexico
Flora without expected TNC conservation status